A City by the Light Divided is the fourth studio album by Thursday, released by Island Records on May 2, 2006.

Background
Following a number of issues regarding promotion and lack of communication with independent label Victory Records, Thursday announced they had signed to major label Island Records in May 2002. With the signing being made official in September, the group began working on material for their third album in November. Starting in January 2003, recording sessions lasted six months. War All the Time was released in September. Following its release, keyboardist Andrew Everding, who had performed on the album, became a full-time member of the band. The group subsequently embarked on an exhaustive touring schedule with performances in the UK, Japan, New Zealand and Australia. As a result of this touring, personal problems between members began to occur, but by July they were aiming to record in the next few months.

Production
In September, early demos leaked, and later that month the group started pre-production, done with Tim Gilles. Recording took place at Tarbox Road Studios, in Cassadaga, New York with producer Dave Fridmann Amanda Tannen of Stellastarr and Mary Fridmann of Bass Piggy provided additional vocals on "We Will Overcome". In mid-February, recording was finished and the album was in the process of being mixed by Fridmann. Tom Coyne mastered the album at Sterling sound, in New York City.

Release
On February 5, 2006, A City by the Light Divided was announced for release in May. In mid-February, the group were working on ideas for a music video for "Counting 5-4-3-2-1" with production companies Refused TV and Artificial Army. The song was made available for streaming on February 28. From mid March to the beginning of April, the band went on the first leg of the Shirts for a Cure tour, with support from Minus the Bear, The Number Twelve Looks Like You, and We're All Broken. On March 29, "At This Velocity" was made available for streaming via Alternative Press. For most of April, the band went on the 2006 edition of the Taste of Chaos tour. However, on April 13, Rickly became ill, resulting in the band dropping off the tour. On April 18, A City by the Light Divided was made available for streaming via the band's Myspace profile, and "Counting 5-4-3-2-1" was released to radio.

From late April to late May, the band went on the second leg of the Shirts for a Cure tour, with support from Minus the Bear, mewithoutYou and We're All Broken. A City by the Light Divided was released on May 2 through Island Records. The UK version of the album, which was released through Hassle Records, included the bonus track "Even the Sand Is Made of Seashells". In May and June, the group went on a UK tour. In the summer, the band went on the 2006 edition of Warped Tour. In October and November, the group went on the 2006 international edition of the Taste of Chaos tour, visiting New Zealand, Australia, and the UK. In between dates on this tour, the band went on a co-headlining tour with Rise Against. In January and February 2007, the band went on a tour of the U.S. with support from Fear Before the March of Flames, Murder by Death and Heavy Heavy Low Low.

Reception

Critical response
The album so far has a score of 75 out of 100 from Metacritic based on "generally favorable reviews". AbsolutePunk gave it a score of 90% and said that " just like the Buffalo Bills, it’s not about how you start the game, but about how strong you can comeback and finish, and A City By The Light Divided exemplifies this very well." Blender gave it a score of four stars out of five and called it "A widescreen goth-punk stunner." Billboard gave it a positive review and called it "A quality album." Some reviews are average or mixed: Uncut gave it three stars out of five and said, "A sprinkle of Flaming Lips fairy-dust may be just what the genre needs to slip its genre straitjacket."  Melodic.net also gave it a score of three stars out of five and said it was "not a superb album but it's a helluva lot better than War All the Time."

Commercial performance
It reached #20 on the Billboard 200. A month after its release, the album had sold over 81,000 copies. By July, it had sold 90,000 copies. By April 2007, it had sold 132,000 copies.

Track listing
All music by Thursday, all lyrics by Geoff Rickly.

Bonus tracks

Personnel
Personnel per booklet.

Thursday
Geoff Rickly – lead vocals
Tom Keeley – lead guitar
Steve Pedulla – rhythm guitar
Tim Payne – bass guitar
Tucker Rule – drums
Andrew Everding – keyboards

Additional musicians
Amanda Tannen – additional vocals on "We Will Overcome"
Mary Fridmann – additional vocals on "We Will Overcome"

Production
Dave Fridmann – producer, mixing, engineer
Tom Coyne – mastering
Tim Gilles – pre-production
Melissa Cross – vocal coach
Louis Marino – art direction, illustration, design
Ken Schless – Photography

Charts

References
Citations

Sources

 

2006 albums
Thursday (band) albums
Island Records albums
Albums produced by Dave Fridmann
Albums recorded at Tarbox Road Studios